Emily Capers (( Day born August 9, 1987, in Torrance, California) is a female beach volleyball player from the United States who won the gold medal at the NORCECA Circuit 2009 in Jamaica playing with Claire Robertson.

She studied at Loyola Marymount University where she got a degree in applied mathematics with a minor in Business Administration, receiving as a student athlete the awards of All Tournament and MVP at the 2008 Four Points Sheraton Classic, All Tournament at the "MCM Elegante Lobo Classic", "Academic All-District team", 2008 All Conference First Team and All Academic.

She partnered with Jennifer Kessy to start the 2015 AVP season.

Awards

College
 2008 MCM Elegante Lobo Classic All Tournament
 2008 Four Points Sheraton Classic All Tournament/MVP
 2008 Collegiate Volleyball Update's Stellar Spikers Honorable Mention
 2008 West Coast Conference All Academic Team
 2008 All West Coast Conference First Team
 2008 CoSIDA Academic All-District Third Team
 2007 West Coast Conference All Academic Team
 2007 All West Coast Conference First Team
 2006 Hilton Phoenix/East Mesa Sun Devil Classic All Tournament
 2006 West Coast Conference All Academic Team
 2006 All West Coast Conference Honorable Mention
 2005 Freshman All West Coast Conference First Team

AVP Pro Tour
 AVP Pro Tour Young Guns Manhattan Beach 2009  Gold Medal
 AVP Pro Tour Young Guns Long Beach 2009  Silver Medal
 AVP Pro Tour Champion Cincinnati Open 2013
 AVP Pro Tour Champion St. Petersburg Open (title split with opposing team Jenn Kessy/April Ross after cancellation due to weather)
 AVP Most Improved Player 2013
 AVP Pro Tour Manhattan Beach Open 2016, 2017   Gold Medal
 AVP Pro Tour Huntington Beach Open 2017   Gold Medal
 AVP Pro Tour Hermosa Beach Open 2017   Gold Medal
 AVP Team of the Year 2017 (with Brittany Hochevar)

National Team
 NORCECA Beach Volleyball Circuit Jamaica 2009  Gold Medal
 FIVB Phuket Open 2013  Silver Medal
 USAV Beach Team of the Year 2011 (with Heather McGuire)

References

External links
 
 
 

1987 births
Living people
American women's beach volleyball players
Pan American Games competitors for the United States
Beach volleyball players at the 2011 Pan American Games
Loyola Marymount University alumni
Loyola Marymount Lions women's volleyball players
Universiade medalists in beach volleyball
Universiade silver medalists for the United States
Medalists at the 2011 Summer Universiade
21st-century American women